Central Naval Museum is a naval museum in St Petersburg, Russia. It is one of the first museums in Russia and one of the world’s largest naval museums, with a large collection of artefacts, models and paintings reflecting the development of Russian naval traditions and the history of the Russian Navy. The museum’s permanent display includes such relics as the Botik of Peter the Great, Catherine II’s marine throne, trophies captured in sea battles, and the personal belongings of prominent Russian and Soviet naval commanders. The collection includes paintings by Ivan Aivazovsky, Alexey Bogolyubov, Lev Lagorio and other marine artists, ship sculpture, navigational instruments, naval equipment and machinery from the 17th to 20th centuries and numerous models of ships. The main exposition consists of nineteen halls. There is a complex of six museum halls for exhibitions.

History

Imperial era 
The museum originates from the St. Petersburg Model Chamber, used to store models and drawings related to shipbuilding. The Model Chamber was first mentioned in records on 24 January 1709, the date now used as the birthday of the museum. Peter I, who at the time was with his army in the Ukraine, sent instructions to Alexander Kikin, reading : “Take the Model Chamber out of my house and place it by the shipyard, wherever a proper place is available …”. The Model Chamber was located in the Main Admiralty, where ships of the Baltic Fleet were built.

The Model Chamber's collection became the basis for a "Maritime Museum", which was created in 1805. By the end of the nineteenth century the Maritime Museum had become a significant Russian cultural and scientific centre, known throughout the world.

Soviet era 
In August 1939 the Central Naval Museum was relocated to the Stock Exchange building. It opened in its new location in February 1941, but its work was interrupted four months later by the German invasion of the Soviet Union and the beginning of the Great Patriotic War.

The museum today 
The museum supports business relationships and organizes joint exhibitions with dozens of Russian and foreign museums.

Gallery

See also
 List of museums in Saint Petersburg

References

External links 

 Official site of the Museum

1709 establishments in Russia
Museums established in 1709
Maritime museums in Saint Petersburg
Military and war museums in Saint Petersburg
Russian Navy
Soviet Navy
Naval history of Russia